Asafiev Glacier is a glacier that flows north-west into Schubert Inlet from the western side of the Walton Mountains, Alexander Island, Antarctica. It was named by the USSR Academy of Sciences in 1987 after Boris Asafiev, the Russian composer.

See also
 List of glaciers in the Antarctic
 Alyabiev Glacier
 Arensky Glacier
 Glaciology

References
 

Glaciers of Alexander Island